Guardians of the Galaxy Vol. 3 (stylized as Guardians of the Galaxy Volume 3) is an upcoming American superhero film based on the Marvel Comics superhero team Guardians of the Galaxy, produced by Marvel Studios, and distributed by Walt Disney Studios Motion Pictures. It is intended to be the sequel to Guardians of the Galaxy (2014) and Guardians of the Galaxy Vol. 2 (2017), and the 32nd film in the Marvel Cinematic Universe (MCU). The film is written and directed by James Gunn and stars an ensemble cast featuring Chris Pratt, Zoe Saldaña, Dave Bautista, Karen Gillan, Pom Klementieff, Vin Diesel, Bradley Cooper, Sean Gunn, Chukwudi Iwuji, Will Poulter, Elizabeth Debicki, Maria Bakalova, and Sylvester Stallone. In the film, the Guardians embark on a mission to protect Rocket (Cooper).

James Gunn said in November 2014 that he had initial ideas for a third film in the series, and announced his return to write and direct in April 2017. Disney fired him from the film in July 2018 following the resurfacing of controversial posts on Twitter, but the studio reversed course by that October and reinstated Gunn as director. Gunn's return was publicly revealed in March 2019, with production resuming after Gunn completed work on his film The Suicide Squad (2021) and the first season of its spin-off series Peacemaker (2022). Filming began in November 2021 at Trilith Studios in Atlanta, Georgia, and lasted until early May 2022.

Guardians of the Galaxy Vol. 3 is scheduled to be released in the United States on May 5, 2023, as part of Phase Five of the MCU.

Premise 
The Guardians of the Galaxy are adjusting to life on Knowhere when parts of Rocket's past resurface. In order to protect him, Peter Quill must lead the Guardians on a dangerous mission that could lead to the team dissolving.

Cast 

 Chris Pratt as Peter Quill / Star-Lord:The half-human, half-Celestial leader of the Guardians of the Galaxy who was abducted from Earth as a child and raised by a group of alien thieves and smugglers called the Ravagers.
 Zoe Saldaña as Gamora:An orphan who seeks redemption for her past crimes, and was adopted and trained by Thanos to be his personal assassin. The original version of Gamora, a member of the Guardians, was killed by Thanos in Avengers: Infinity War (2018), and a younger version of the character traveled to the present in Avengers: Endgame (2019); Saldaña reprises the latter role in this film, now serving as the leader of the Ravagers.
 Dave Bautista as Drax the Destroyer:A member of the Guardians and a highly skilled warrior whose family was slaughtered by Ronan the Accuser, under the instructions of Thanos. Bautista stated that Vol. 3 would be the final time he would portray Drax, having been grateful for the role, while still calling it a "relief" to have concluded his time with the character, given the long hours needed to get into makeup and hoping to pursue more dramatic acting roles.
 Karen Gillan as Nebula:A member of the Guardians, a former Avenger, and Gamora's adoptive sister who, similarly to her, was trained by their adoptive father Thanos to be his personal assassin. Gillan believed Nebula was developing into a "slightly different person" with more levity as she starts to heal psychologically following the death of Thanos, who was the source of her abuse and torment. Vol. 3 fulfills a character arc for the character writer and director James Gunn envisioned when starting work on Guardians of the Galaxy (2014), going from a minor villain to a member of the Guardians.
 Pom Klementieff as Mantis: A member of the Guardians with empathic powers, and Quill's half-sister.
 Vin Diesel as Groot: A member of the Guardians who is a tree-like humanoid and the accomplice of Rocket. Given his increased, more buff size, he is referred to as "Swole Groot".
 Bradley Cooper as Rocket:A member of the Guardians and a former Avenger who is a genetically-engineered raccoon-based bounty hunter and a master of weapons and military tactics. Gunn said that the film tells Rocket's story, including his background and "where he's going", along with how that ties into the other Guardians and the end of this iteration of the team. The film completes a character arc that was established in Guardians of the Galaxy and Guardians of the Galaxy Vol. 2 (2017), and continued in Infinity War and Endgame.
 Sean Gunn as Kraglin Obfonteri: A member of the Guardians and Yondu Udonta's former second-in-command in the Ravagers.
 Chukwudi Iwuji as the High Evolutionary:A scientist specializing in evolution and Rocket's creator who seeks to forcibly enhance all living beings into a "special race". Iwuji described the character as "narcissistic, sociopathic, but very charming", adding that there was "something very Shakespearean about him, there's something very emotionally dark about him, and he's a lot of fun on top of all that".
 Will Poulter as Adam Warlock:A powerful artificial being created by the Sovereign to destroy the Guardians. Given Warlock is newly born from the Sovereign's cocoon, he is "basically a baby" that "does not understand life very well". Gunn thought Warlock's interactions with the Guardians provided "an interesting juxtaposition" to what their journey has been, and described him as a more traditional superhero compared to the Guardians, although not necessarily a hero.
 Elizabeth Debicki as Ayesha: The golden High Priestess and the leader of the Sovereign people. In that role, she had Adam Warlock created to destroy the Guardians.
 Maria Bakalova as Cosmo the Spacedog:A member of the Guardians who is a sapient dog that developed psionic abilities after being sent into space by the Soviet Union. Gunn changed Cosmo's gender from male, as depicted in the comics, to female for the film, as a tribute to the character's original inspiration Laika, a Soviet space dog who became one of the first animals in space. In addition to voice acting, Bakalova provided motion capture for the character. Cosmo was physically portrayed by dog actors Fred and Slate in the first two Guardians films and The Guardians of the Galaxy Holiday Special (2022), respectively.
 Sylvester Stallone as Stakar Ogord: A high-ranking Ravager.

Additionally, Michael Rosenbaum reprises his Vol. 2 role as Martinex, a high-ranking Ravager, while Daniela Melchior, Nico Santos, and Asim Chaudhry are cast in undisclosed roles, with Melchior's part said to be a small role. Callie Brand will appear as an alien. Also slated to appear in the film is Lylla, an anthropomorphic otter who is an associate and love interest of Rocket.

Production

Development

Initial work 
Guardians of the Galaxy (2014) writer and director James Gunn stated in November 2014 that, in addition to having the "basic story" for Guardians of the Galaxy Vol. 2 (2017) while working on the first film, he also had ideas for a potential third film. Despite this, he was unsure in June 2015 if he would be involved with a third Guardians film, saying that it would depend on how he felt after making Vol. 2. In April 2016, Marvel Studios president Kevin Feige, the producer of the Guardians films, said a third film was planned for the franchise as part of the Marvel Cinematic Universe (MCU) in "2020 and beyond". In March 2017, Gunn said there would be a third film "for sure. We're trying to figure it out", soon adding that there were no specific plans for the film yet, but that Marvel would want to make it "unless something goes horribly—which is always possible, you never know". He also reiterated that he had not decided whether he would be directing the film, and that he was going to figure out his involvement and his next project "over the next couple of weeks". Part of Gunn's reluctance to return to the franchise came from not wanting to work on it without Michael Rooker, whose character from the first two films, Yondu Udonta, died at the end of Vol. 2.

Gunn announced in April 2017 that he would return to write and direct Guardians of the Galaxy Vol. 3. He said the film would be set after Avengers: Infinity War (2018) and Avengers: Endgame (2019), and would "conclude the story of this iteration of the Guardians of the Galaxy, and help catapult both old and new Marvel characters into the next ten years and beyond". He also felt that the three Guardians films would "work together as a whole", telling one story, with the third film "tying a lot of stuff together" from the first two and giving "a lot of answers on a lot of different things". Gunn also planned to work with Marvel on the future of the "Marvel Cosmic Universe". He was set to begin work on Vol. 3 shortly after completing his work as executive producer and consultant on Infinity War. On returning for the third film, Gunn said, "I wouldn't have said yes if I didn't have a fairly clear idea of where we were going and what we were going to do. I'm not a guy that's just going to do it if I don't have a vision for it".

After originally including Adam Warlock in his script treatment for Vol. 2, Gunn and Feige noted the importance of the character on the cosmic side of the MCU and hinted that he would make an appearance in Vol. 3. In May 2017, after the release of Vol. 2, Gunn said he would be creating the third film "over the next three years", and confirmed that Pom Klementieff would reprise her role as Mantis. He also intended to have Elizabeth Debicki reprise her role as Ayesha. By mid-June, Gunn had completed the first draft of his script treatment for the third film, and was considering changing a piece of character info he had placed in the background of the mugshot sequence in the first film (when the Guardians are captured by the Nova Corps). In September, Gunn reiterated that Vol. 3 would be released "in a little under three years", as the film had privately been set for release on May 1, 2020. At the end of February 2018, Gunn planned to meet with Mark Hamill about possibly appearing in the film. In April, Chris Pratt was set to reprise his role as Peter Quill / Star-Lord, and the following month, Dave Bautista confirmed that he would reprise his role as Drax the Destroyer. Marvel received the completed first draft of the screenplay from Gunn by the end of June, ahead of the beginning of official pre-production on the film.

Firing of James Gunn 
On July 20, 2018, Disney and Marvel severed ties with Gunn. This came after conservative commentators began circulating old tweets he had made regarding controversial topics such as rape and pedophilia, and called for his firing. The Walt Disney Studios chairman Alan F. Horn stated, "The offensive attitudes and statements discovered on James' Twitter feed are indefensible and inconsistent with our studio's values, and we have severed our business relationship with him". While not part of the decision to fire Gunn, the Walt Disney Company CEO Bob Iger supported the "unanimous decision" from the various executives at Marvel and Walt Disney Studios. In response, Gunn said in a series of tweets that when he started his career he was "making movies and telling jokes that were outrageous and taboo" but felt as he has "developed as a person, so has my work and my humor". He continued, "It's not to say I'm better, but I am very, very different than I was a few years ago; today I try to root my work in love and connection and less in anger. My days saying something just because it's shocking and trying to get a reaction are over". In a separate statement, Gunn said the tweets at the time were "totally failed and unfortunate efforts to be provocative", adding "I understand and accept the business decisions taken today. Even these many years later, I take full responsibility for the way I conducted myself then".

In response to the firing, many of the Guardians cast members tweeted support for Gunn. Rooker decided to leave Twitter, while fans signed an online petition asking for Gunn to be reinstated which received over 300,000 signatures. The firing also garnered reaction from other Hollywood personalities, such as actress Selma Blair and comedian Bobcat Goldthwait, and inspired opinion pieces on the firing and how it would affect Hollywood from Kareem Abdul-Jabbar, and news organizations such as The Hollywood Reporter, Variety, Deadline Hollywood, and Forbes. On July 30, the cast of the Guardians of the Galaxy films, including Pratt, Zoe Saldaña, Bautista, Bradley Cooper, Vin Diesel, Sean Gunn, Klementieff, Rooker, and Karen Gillan, issued a statement in support of James Gunn, saying, "We fully support James Gunn. We were all shocked by his abrupt firing last week and have intentionally waited these ten days to respond in order to think, pray, listen, and discuss. In that time, we've been encouraged by the outpouring of support from fans and members of the media who wish to see James reinstated as director of Volume 3 as well as discouraged by those so easily duped into believing the many outlandish conspiracy theories surrounding him". Despite this and the notable "vociferous support" Gunn received, Variety reported that Disney was not planning to rehire him as the jokes were "unacceptable in the #MeToo era and are not in line with Disney's family-friendly image". Variety continued that, despite rumors of Gunn being replaced by established Marvel directors such as Jon Favreau, Taika Waititi, or the Russo brothers, Marvel had yet to meet with any other director, and would most likely hire someone new. In early August, Bautista said that he would fulfill his contract and appear in the film as long as Marvel chose to use Gunn's existing script.

Disney and Marvel still wanted to "move forward quickly" on the film, and were soon confirmed to be keeping Gunn's script. This, combined with the fact that Gunn did not breach his contract since the tweets were written years before he signed on to the film, had led to "complicated negotiations" between Gunn and Disney over his exit settlement. Gunn was expected to be paid $7–10 million or more, and there was some hope that the negotiations could lead to him eventually returning in some capacity, "even if [it was] to develop and direct another Marvel movie". Gunn would be free to move on to new projects following the settlement, and other major studios were interested in hiring him including Warner Bros. for their rival superhero franchise, the DC Extended Universe (DCEU). During this time, executives at Marvel Studios began "back channel conversations" with Disney in an attempt to find a compromise that could lead to Gunn returning to the film in some way. This "eleventh hour" effort from Marvel was inspired by the statements from the film's cast. In mid-August, Gunn met with Horn following a strong push from Gunn's talent agency for him to be given a second chance. Despite this and the reported "civil and professional" nature of the meeting, Horn only took it as a courtesy and used it to reaffirm Disney's decision to fire Gunn.

Later in August, the small crew that was preparing for pre-production were dismissed as production of the film was postponed so Marvel and Disney could find a director to replace Gunn. Pre-production was to have begun by the end of 2018, with principal photography set for January or February 2019. At this time, Bautista was unsure if he would return for the film, as he did not know if he would "want to work for Disney" given how they handled the firing of Gunn. In late September, James Gunn's brother Sean, who played Kraglin Obfonteri and provided motion capture for Rocket in the previous Guardians films, reiterated that Disney still intended on making the film with James' script, but had not revealed to the cast when production may continue. Sean added that he had been preparing to reprise his roles for the third film before his brother's firing. At the end of the month, Cooper was asked if he would consider directing Vol. 3 after the success of his directorial debut A Star Is Born (2018), but said that he "could never imagine" directing a film that he did not write. By mid-October, James Gunn had completed his exit settlement with Disney and was set to write and potentially direct The Suicide Squad (2021) for Warner Bros.

Rehiring Gunn 
The day after Gunn joined The Suicide Squad in mid-October 2018, he was privately notified by Horn that he could return as director for Vol. 3. This came after further meetings between the studios and Gunn. Horn had changed his mind after being impressed by Gunn's response to the situation. Gunn discussed his commitments to The Suicide Squad with Feige, and production on Vol. 3 was put on hold until February 2021 to allow Gunn to complete The Suicide Squad first. In December, after working with Marvel Studios on the script for Ant-Man (2015), Adam McKay said he was willing to work with the studio again and stated that he had discussed taking over as director for Vol. 3 with Feige, among other projects. In early 2019, Feige and Pratt reiterated that Marvel would still make Vol. 3, and in March 2019, Gunn was publicly revealed to have been rehired as director of the film. Deadline Hollywood stated that Marvel Studios had "never met with or considered any other director" for the film. By the end of April, the franchise's five main stars—Pratt, Saldaña, Bautista, Cooper, and Diesel—were all expected to return for the sequel, with filming to take place in 2020.

Discussing his firing and re-hiring in May 2019, Gunn said that of all the elements of the film that he had been sad to leave when he was fired, the most meaningful to him was the character of Rocket. Gunn personally identifies with Rocket, describing himself and the character as "the same". That month, Gillan confirmed that she was returning for the sequel and expressed excitement for Gunn's return to the franchise. In June, Saldaña was asked about her role in the film after her character Gamora was killed in Infinity War, and she returned to play a younger version in Endgame who travels through time to the present. Saldaña said that Gamora's fate would depend on the plans that Marvel and Gunn have for Vol. 3, but that she would like to see Gamora rejoin the Guardians and also be portrayed as "the most lethal woman in the galaxy" as she has been referred to previously. Gunn was asked in October if he was unhappy about Marvel's decision to kill Gamora in Infinity War and said he was not, adding that he had discussed the storyline with the studio beforehand. According to Infinity War and Endgame screenwriters Christopher Markus and Stephen McFeely, Gamora was brought back in Endgame specifically so that Gunn could include her in Vol. 3. In December, Gunn was asked if he would have Yondu return in the film and said as long as he was involved with the Guardians characters, he would not have the character be resurrected. Gunn felt the stakes of a character's death were important and said characters who die in his films would likely remain dead. Gunn said in February 2020 that bringing Yondu back to life would "nullify Yondu's sacrifice" in Vol. 2, and said the character would not return unless it was for a prequel or flashback; Gunn later said Yondu would not be resurrected in the film to not diminish his death's meaning. In April, Gunn said the COVID-19 pandemic would not affect production plans for the film at that time, saying the next month that the film would be released "a little after 2021".

In August 2020, Gunn turned in a new draft of the film's script and began writing a spin-off television series from The Suicide Squad titled Peacemaker (2022). A month later, he was planning to begin work on Vol. 3 in 2021 after completing that film and series. He confirmed in November that the script for Vol. 3 was finished, and said that very little had changed from his initial ideas despite the production setbacks. The film was given a 2023 release date a month later, with filming set to begin in late 2021. Shortly after, it was revealed to also be set after The Guardians of the Galaxy Holiday Special (2022).

Pre-production 
Pre-production work creating the designs and visuals for the film began by April 2021. In early May, Marvel Studios announced that the film would be released on May 5, 2023. Later that month, Gunn said Vol. 3 would take place after the events of Thor: Love and Thunder (2022), which features several Guardians characters. Gunn had begun storyboarding the film by June, with filming later revealed to begin in November 2021 in Atlanta, Georgia for an expected end around April 2022. By then, Bautista said he had not read a script for Vol. 3 and was unsure if it had changed during the production delays. The next month, Gillan said that she and Klementieff had read the script together and she found it to be incredible, brilliant, emotional, and funny. She also felt it was Gunn's "strongest work yet" with the Guardians characters. Gunn reiterated that the script had "basically stayed the same" from three years prior but he had been "playing with it in little ways" over the years. He was in the middle of another draft by the end of the month and said the film would be emotional and have a "heavier" story than the previous films, with a more grounded approach that was inspired by The Suicide Squad and Peacemaker. Gunn originally wrote a cameo appearance for Kumail Nanjiani, a friend of his, but removed this after learning Nanjiani was cast as Kingo in Marvel Studios' Eternals (2021).

By late August, Gunn and Marvel Studios began meeting with actors for the role of Adam Warlock, including Will Poulter. George MacKay was also on the shortlist, and Regé-Jean Page was considered for the part. Poulter auditioned for the role over Zoom before an in-person screen test with Gunn in Atlanta. In September, Gillan reiterated her positive comments about the script and said the film would explore the characters from the previous Guardians films on a deeper level, while Seth Green, who voices Howard the Duck in the MCU, said the film would be about Gamora and Nebula's story. He did not know at that time if Howard would appear after doing so in the previous Guardians films. Poulter was cast as Adam Warlock in October, and Gunn said "dozens of roles" had already been cast. Poulter was chosen for the part because of his dramatic and comedic abilities and because Gunn "wanted somebody who was youthful" and would fit with Marvel Studios' future plans for the character. Casting also took place for various background roles, including aliens and security guards. Pratt began rehearsals and camera tests later that month, and a production meeting was held in early November, shortly before the start of filming. Gunn also reiterated his comments on not resurrecting Yondu in the film.

Filming 
Principal photography began on November 8, 2021, at Trilith Studios in Atlanta, Georgia, under the working title Hot Christmas. Henry Braham serves as cinematographer, after doing so for Vol. 2 and The Guardians of the Galaxy Holiday Special. Filming was previously scheduled to begin in January or February 2019 prior to Gunn's firing, and then in February 2021, before Gunn began work on Peacemaker. With the start of filming, Sylvester Stallone revealed that he would return as Stakar Ogord from Vol. 2, and Gunn posted a photo of the main cast members which revealed that Chukwudi Iwuji was part of the film following his collaboration with Gunn on Peacemaker. Iwuji's screen test for the film was shot on the set of Peacemaker with that series' crew, and Marvel repaid this favor by letting Gunn use the Vol. 3 set and crew to film Ezra Miller's cameo appearance as Barry Allen / The Flash for the Peacemaker season finale.

Production designer Beth Mickle said Gunn chose to mainly use practical effects for Vol. 3 after they did so with their work on The Suicide Squad. In February 2021, Gunn stated the film would be shot using Industrial Light & Magic's StageCraft virtual production technology that was developed for the Disney+ Star Wars series The Mandalorian, but in October, he said they would not be able to use the technology because the sets were too big, believing they were larger than the sets used on The Suicide Squad. The interior of the Guardians' new ship, the Bowie, was a four-story set. Judianna Makovsky serves as costume designer. The Guardians of the Galaxy Holiday Special was filmed at the same time as Vol. 3, from February to late April 2022, with the same main cast and sets. Gunn enjoyed being able to switch to filming the special after doing scenes for Vol. 3, given the tonal difference between the two with Vol. 3 being more "emotional", feeling it helped provide a "relief" to the actors as well, and called the Holiday Special shoot easier than Vol. 3. In February 2022, Callie Brand was revealed to appear in the film as an alien. Shooting was also expected to occur in London, England, in late 2021. Filming wrapped on May 6, 2022.

Post-production 
In early June 2022, Daniela Melchior was revealed to have a small role in the film, after previously starring in The Suicide Squad. Debicki was also confirmed to be reprising her role as Ayesha, while Maria Bakalova and Nico Santos were also revealed to be appearing in the film. In July, Iwuji and Bakalova were revealed to be portraying the High Evolutionary and Cosmo the Spacedog, respectively. Cosmo was physically portrayed by dog actors Fred and Slate in the first two Guardians films and the Holiday Special, respectively. The following month, Michael Rosenbaum revealed that he had reprised his role as Martinex from Vol. 2 in the film. In October 2022, it was revealed that Bakalova would portray Cosmo in the Holiday Special ahead of her role in Vol. 3. In February 2023, Asim Chaudhry revealed he would appear in the film in an undisclosed role.

The visual effects were provided by Framestore, Weta FX, Sony Pictures ImageWorks, Industrial Light & Magic, Rodeo FX, Rise FX, Crafty Apes, BUF, Lola VFX, Perception, and Compuhire. Stephane Ceretti returns from the first film to serve as the visual effects supervisor, while Fred Raskin returns from the first two films to serve as the editor, alongside Greg D'Auria, who returns from the Holiday Special.

Music 
In April 2017, Gunn felt the music for the film would be different from what was used for the first two films' soundtracks, Awesome Mix Vol. 1 and Vol. 2. The next month, he added that he was "panicking" about the soundtrack and had to make some "pretty specific choices" shortly due to the wider range of available music for the story, By early July 2017, Gunn had narrowed down his choices for potential songs to 181, but noted that this list could grow again. All of the songs for the film had been selected by the following month; the songs are not modern and come from Quill's Zune that he received at the end of Vol. 2, although Gunn added that the soundtrack was not limited to 1970s pop songs compared to the first two films. Gunn was unable to use a song he wanted for Vol. 3 due to a legal battle over its ownership.

In October 2021, Gunn revealed that John Murphy was composing the film's score and had already recorded music to be played on set during filming. Murphy replaces Tyler Bates, who composed the score for the first two films; Murphy had also replaced Bates as composer of The Suicide Squad after Bates left that film during production.

Marketing 
The film was discussed during Marvel Studios' panel at the 2022 San Diego Comic-Con, where the first footage was revealed. Iwuji was also announced as playing the High Evolutionary, appearing at the panel in costume. Gunn stated the footage was not released publicly because the visual effects were not complete enough for "repeated views and close inspection". An official trailer was released on December 1, 2022, during the CCXP. It featured "In the Meantime" by Spacehog. Drew Taylor of TheWrap called the trailer a doozy, thrilling, and emotional, and stated that "Gunn's patented, rollicking 'Guardians of the Galaxy' tone is very much in place", and noted "an undercurrent of extreme melancholy". Carson Burton of Variety predicted from the trailer that the film would be "shaping up to be an emotional ending" by showing Rocket's memories and Star-Lord missing Gamora. Jay Peters at The Verge said the trailer intrigued him as a "wild ride across the stars" with different planets.

A second trailer for the film was released during Super Bowl LVII on February 12, 2023. It featured "Since You Been Gone" by Rainbow. Grant Hermanns of Screen Rant felt the trailer gave "a deeper look" at the film, particularly Adam Warlock's powers as compared to his brief appearance in the first one. Hermanns also said the second trailer "goes a step further in highlighting the emotional story" after the first one "efficiently set [the film's] tone, featuring plenty of melancholic shots of the [Guardians of the Galaxy] facing the music". The trailer accumulated 134.1 million views across TikTok, Instagram, YouTube, Twitter, and Facebook, and was the most-watched Super Bowl trailer in post-game day traffic according to RelishMix. It was also the first time since the onset of the COVID-19 pandemic that a Super Bowl trailer exceeded 100 million views on social media in a 24-hour period.

Release 
Guardians of the Galaxy Vol. 3 is scheduled to be released in the United States and China on May 5, 2023. The film was previously set for release on May 1, 2020, before it was dropped from that date. It will be part of Phase Five of the MCU.

Accolades 

Cynthia Blondelle and Heather Kreamer were nominated at the 2023 Guild of Music Supervisors Awards for Best Music Supervision in a Trailer – Film.

Future 
Gunn said in April 2017 that a fourth Guardians film could happen, though it would likely center on a new group of characters since Gunn planned to conclude the story of the team of the previous films in Vol. 3. Later in September, Gunn felt that he was unlikely to return for another Guardians film, but noted he would continue to work with Marvel Studios on other projects that use the Guardians and cosmic characters. One such project from Gunn was a film centered on Drax and Mantis, which Bautista called "brilliant". However, in May 2021 Bautista had not heard any further updates regarding it, feeling Marvel Studios was not "very interested, or it doesn't fit into the way they have things mapped out". Gunn confirmed in September 2019 that he intended for Vol. 3 to be his last Guardians film, which he reaffirmed in May 2021. In July 2021, Gillan expressed her desire to continue to play Nebula after Vol. 3.

References

External links 

  at Marvel.com
 

2018 controversies in the United States
2020s American films
2020s English-language films
2020s superhero films
2023 action comedy films
2023 adventure films
2023 science fiction films
American action comedy films
American science fiction action films
American science fiction comedy-drama films
American sequel films
American space adventure films
American superhero comedy films
American superhero films
Disney controversies
Fiction about intergalactic travel
Films about extraterrestrial life
Films about genetic engineering
Films directed by James Gunn
Films scored by John Murphy (composer)
Films set on fictional planets
Films shot at Trilith Studios
Films shot in Atlanta
Films shot in Georgia (U.S. state)
Films with screenplays by James Gunn
Guardians of the Galaxy (film series)
Guardians of the Galaxy films
IMAX films
Marvel Cinematic Universe: Phase Five films
Superhero comedy-drama films
Upcoming sequel films